Goodbye Kathmandu is a Nepali movie directed by Nabin Subba. The main characters of the film are Anoop Baral, Malvika Subba, Karma, and Shahana Shrestha. This movie portrays the story of struggle to migrate to live in the capital city of Nepal i.e. Kathmandu. Rajesh Gongaju is the author of the film. Theierry Taieb is the cinematographer.

References

Nepalese drama films
2010s Nepali-language films
Films shot in Kathmandu